Gloria Escomel (born October 15, 1941) is a Uruguayan-born Canadian writer. She first moved from Uruguay to France in 1960 to study literature at the Université de Paris, later moving to Canada to pursue her doctorate at the Université de Montréal.

Escomel was a lecturer at the Université du Québec à Montréal from 1978 to 1988, and wrote as a journalist for publications including Châtelaine, L'Actualité, Perspectives, La Gazette des femmes, Le Devoir, La Liberté and La Nouvelle barre du jour. She received the Judith Jasmin Award in 1988 for her Gazette article "Quelle vieillesse vous préparez-vous: un âge d'or ou d'argent?"

Escomel has also published novels, short stories and radio plays for Radio-Canada's Première Chaîne, as well as numerous policy documents for the Government of Quebec on disability, LGBT and human rights issues.

Escomel is an out lesbian.

Works
1980 - La table d'écoute ou le temps-spirale (play)
1980 - Tu en parleras… et après ? (play)
1981 - J'enfante ma mémoire (play)
1981 - Des bâtons dans les roues (play)
1983 - La surdoublée (play)
1988 - Fruit de la passion (novel)
1992 - Pièges (novel)
1994 - Les eaux de la mémoire (short stories)

References

1941 births
20th-century Canadian novelists
Canadian women dramatists and playwrights
Canadian short story writers in French
Canadian women novelists
Writers from Montreal
Canadian lesbian writers
Uruguayan lesbian writers
Uruguayan emigrants to Canada
Université de Montréal alumni
Academic staff of the Université du Québec à Montréal
Living people
Canadian feminist writers
People from Montevideo
Uruguayan novelists
Uruguayan dramatists and playwrights
Uruguayan women writers
Uruguayan LGBT journalists
Uruguayan LGBT dramatists and playwrights
Uruguayan LGBT novelists
University of Paris alumni
Canadian radio writers
Women radio writers
Canadian magazine journalists
Canadian newspaper journalists
Canadian LGBT journalists
Canadian LGBT dramatists and playwrights
Canadian LGBT novelists
20th-century Canadian dramatists and playwrights
Canadian women short story writers
20th-century Canadian women writers
Canadian novelists in French
Canadian dramatists and playwrights in French
20th-century Canadian short story writers
Uruguayan feminists
Canadian women non-fiction writers
Uruguayan expatriates in France
Lesbian dramatists and playwrights
Lesbian novelists
Lesbian journalists
20th-century Canadian LGBT people
20th-century Uruguayan LGBT people
21st-century Canadian LGBT people
21st-century Uruguayan LGBT people